Reformation Today is a Christian magazine. It was founded by Erroll Hulse in 1970, who served as editor until 2013. The current editor is Kees van Kralingen.

Curt Daniel describes RT as "the unofficial organ of the Reformed Baptists." Tim Grass notes that "compared with most Strict Baptist productions, especially pre-1970, Reformation Today is noticeably more concerned to engage with contemporary social and intellectual trends, as well as offering considerably more demanding articles, historical, ecclesiological and doctrinal."

Reformation Today used to be published bimonthly, but is now published quarterly.

References

External links
 

Magazines established in 1970
Christian magazines
Quarterly magazines published in the United Kingdom
Reformed Baptists